Powelliphanta gilliesi, one of the "amber snails", is a species of large, carnivorous land snail, a terrestrial pulmonate gastropod mollusc in the family Rhytididae.

Distribution
This species is endemic to the West Nelson area of the South Island of New Zealand.

There are nine subspecies, some of which are listed by the New Zealand Department of Conservation:

Powelliphanta gilliesi aurea Powell, 1946
Powelliphanta gilliesi brunnea Powell, 1938
Powelliphanta gilliesi compta Powell, 1930 – Nationally Vulnerable
Powelliphanta gilliesi fallax Powell, 1930 – National Decline
Powelliphanta gilliesi gilliesi Smith, 1880
Powelliphanta gilliesi jamesoni Powell, 1936
Powelliphanta gilliesi kahurangica Powell, 1936
Powelliphanta gilliesi montana Powell, 1936
Powelliphanta gilliesi subfusca Powell, 1930 – Gradual Decline

Life cycle 
The eggs of this species are oval in shape and are seldom constant in dimensions, varying from 9 × 8 mm, to 9.75 × 8 mm, and 10 × 8 mm.

References

Powelliphanta
Gastropods described in 1880
Taxobox binomials not recognized by IUCN
Endemic fauna of New Zealand
Endemic molluscs of New Zealand